Events in the year 2011 in Turkey.

Incumbents
President: Abdullah Gül 
Prime Minister: Recep Tayyip Erdoğan

Events

Deaths

January 
 January 10 - Hanife Çetiner, fashion designer (b. 1938)

February 
 February 2 - Defne Joy Foster, actress, presenter and VJ (b. 1975)
 February 15 - Verda Ün, pianist (b. 1919)
 February 17 - Emel Say, painter (b. 1927)
 February 25 - Kamil Altan, footballer (b. 1924)
 February 27 - Necmettin Erbakan, politician, engineer, and academic (b. 1926)

March 
 March 14 - Jülide Gülizar, anchorwoman and journalist (b. 1929)

April 
 April 8 - Haydar Saltık, general (b. 1923)
 April 15 - Osman Durali, wrestler (b. 1939)
 April 19 - Mustafa Kemal Kurdaş, economist (b. 1920)
 April 25 - Güven Sazak, businessman (b. 1935)

May 
 May 7 - Edibe Subaşı Kutucuoğlu, aviator (b. 1920)
 May 10 - Vedii Tosuncuk, footballer (b. 1921)
 May 29 - Nejat Tümer, admiral (b. 1924)

June 
 June 1 - Fatoş Sezer, actress (b. 1958)
 June 20 - Safa Giray, engineer and politician (b. 1951)
 June 22 - Coşkun Özarı, footballer and manager (b. 1931)
 June 29 - Kaya Köstepen, footballer (b. 1934)

July 
 July 16 - Refik Arslan, founder of Refik Restaurant (b. 1923)
 July 22 - Ali İhsan Göğüş, journalist and politician (b. 1923)
 July 25 - Bakır Çağlar, jurist, lawyer and professor (b. 1941)
 July 31 - Mesude Çağlayan, operatic soprano (b. 1918)

August  
 August 7 - Cem Erman, actor (b. 1947)
 August 16 - Mihri Belli, politician (b. 1915)
 August 18 - Mustafa Haluk Güçlü, painter (b. 1951)
 August 19 - Beki Luiza Bahar, writer (b. 1926)
 August 24 - Seyhan Erözçelik, poet (b. 1962)
 August 28 - Necip Torumtay, general (b. 1926)

September 
 September 4 – Hakkı Boran Ögelman physicist and astrophysicist (b. 1940)
 September 7 – Nedim Günar footballer (b. 1932)

October 
 October 4
 Muzaffer Tema, actor (b. 1919)
 Selma Emiroğlu, cartoonist (b. 1928)
 October 5 – Gökşin Sipahioğlu, photographer and journalist (b. 1926)
 October 13 – Hasan Güngör, wrestler (b. 1934)
 October 18 – Behruz Çinici, architect (b. 1932)
 October 21 – Hikmet Bilâ, journalist and columnist (b. 1954)

November 
 November 1 – Cahit Aral, engineer and politician (b. 1927)
 November 13 – Kaşif Kozinoğlu, intelligence official (b. 1955)
 November 14 – Esin Afşar, singer and stage actress (b. 1936)
 November 19 – Lütfi Ömer Akad, director, screenwriter and academician (b. 1916)
 29 November – Server Tanilli, academic, journalist and author (born 1931)
 November 30 – Benyamin Sönmez, classical cellist (b. 1983)

December 
 December 11 – Ahmed İhsan Kırımlı, politician (b. 1920)
 December 12 – Merih Sezen, fencer (b. 1919)
 December 15 – Fevzi Şeker, wrestler (b. 1962)
 December 23 – Aydın Menderes, politician (b. 1946)
 December 27 – Meral Menderes, operatic soprano (b. 1933)
 December 28 – Hasan Mutlucan, singer (b. 1926)

Events
19 May – The 5.8  Kütahya earthquake shook western Turkey with a maximum Mercalli intensity of VII (Very strong). Two were killed and 122 were injured.
23 October – The 7.1  Van earthquake shook eastern Turkey with a maximum Mercalli intensity of VIII (Severe). More than 600 were killed and 4,152 were injured.

See also
2011 in Turkish television
List of Turkish films of 2011

References

 
Years of the 21st century in Turkey
2010s in Turkey
Turkey
Turkey
Turkey